Lethata glaucopa is a moth of the family Depressariidae. It is found in Colombia.

The wingspan is about 38 mm. The forewings are ferruginous brown, orange tinged towards the costa anteriorly and with the costal edge crimson, becoming ferruginous posteriorly. The second discal stigma is large, round and whitish, centered with dark grey. The hindwings are grey.

References

Moths described in 1912
Lethata
Taxa named by Edward Meyrick